Ramon Laguarta (born 1963) is a Spanish businessman who is the chairman and chief executive officer of PepsiCo. He became CEO on 3 October 2018 after Indra Nooyi stepped down. He is the sixth CEO in the company's history and the first Spanish CEO of a large American multinational company.

Education 
Laguarta graduated with bachelor's and master's degrees in business administration from ESADE Business School in Barcelona in 1985. In 1986 he received a master's degree in international management from the Thunderbird School of Global Management.

Career 
Before joining PepsiCo he worked at Chupa Chups, a candy company based in Spain known for its lollipops. Laguarta joined PepsiCo in January 1996. His first role was in the company's European business, and in 2014 became the CEO of the entire Europe and Sub-Saharan Africa (ESSA) sector. While working in Europe, Laguarta helped lead the acquisition in 2010 of Russian dairy and juice company Wimm-Bill-Dann, a deal valued at $5.4 billion, the company's second largest acquisition after its purchase of Quaker Oats in 2001.

Laguarta was named president of PepsiCo in September 2017. He oversaw PepsiCo's Global Category Groups, its Global Operations, Corporate Strategy and Public Policy & Government Affairs functions. As a result of the promotion, he moved to the United States.

Laguarta was unanimously voted in as PepsiCo's next CEO on 6 August 2018, the same day Indra Nooyi announced she was stepping down. He officially took over the role on 3 October 2018 and became Chairman of the Board of Directors on 1 February 2019. Laguarta has been working at PepsiCo for over 20 years, his previous roles including CEO for Europe Sub-Saharan Africa, president for the PepsiCo Eastern Europe Region, commercial Vice President for PepsiCo Europe, general manager for Iberia Snacks and Juices and General Manager for Greece Snacks. Since becoming CEO of PepsiCo, Laguarta established three priorities to lead the company: Accelerating the company's rate of organic revenue growth; becoming a stronger company; and becoming a better company.

As part of making PepsiCo a better company, Laguarta has been tasked with implementing a new purpose behind PepsiCo's sustainability agenda: helping to build a more sustainable food system. Under his leadership, the company is focusing its efforts and goals around agriculture, water usage, plastics, products, climate change and human rights.

This includes the company's effort to reduce absolute greenhouse gas emissions by at least 20 percent for their entire value chain over a 2015 baseline (roughly 30-35 million metric tons of GHG), as well as their goals by 2025 to make 100% of their packaging recyclable, compostable, or biodegradable and use 25% recycled plastic content in all plastic packaging. Laguarta has also led attempts to reduce waste by acquiring SodaStream. Through the expansion of SodaStream's business, the need for an estimated 67 billion plastic bottles will be avoided through 2025.

In addition to being a member of the PepsiCo Board of Directors, Ramon also currently serves as a director of Visa Inc. He also currently serves as the Co-Chair of the World Economic Forum's Board of Stewards for the Food Systems Initiative.

Personal life 
Laguarta speaks English, Catalan, Spanish, French, German and Greek. He is married with three children.

References 

Living people
Spanish chief executives
PepsiCo people
ESADE alumni
Thunderbird School of Global Management alumni
People from Barcelona
1963 births
Businesspeople from Catalonia
University Ramon Llull alumni
Arizona State University alumni
Spanish expatriates in the United States